Dushica Gjorgjievska (born 28 December 1987) is a Macedonian handball player for Turkish club Zağnos SK and the Macedonian national team.

References

1987 births
Living people
Macedonian female handball players
Macedonian expatriate sportspeople in Turkey
Expatriate handball players in Turkey
Zağnos SK (women's handball) players